ICAM may refer to:

 ICAM (TV series), an Australian Indigenous affairs program that aired from 1995 until 2002
 iCAM (color appearance model), an image color appearance model
 Institut catholique d'arts et métiers, a French Engineering School
 Institut des cultures arabes et méditerranéennes
 Institute for Complex Adaptive Matter
 Integrated Computer-Aided Manufacturing
 Intercellular adhesion molecule
 International Confederation of Architectural Museums
 Mexican Catholic Apostolic Church, or the Iglesia Católica Apostólica Mexicana a schismatic Mexican religious group